Slavko Štimac (born 15 October 1960) is a Serbian actor.

Born in a village near Perušić in Croatia, he later graduated from the Faculty of Dramatic Arts in Belgrade. Štimac made his screen debut in the 1972 children's film Vuk samotnjak. What followed was a career during which Štimac appeared in many popular and important 1970s and 1980s Yugoslav films where he played child and adolescent characters (including the role of young Russian soldier in Sam Peckinpah's Cross of Iron). His youthful looks later plagued his career, typecasting him into adolescent roles well into his 30s. However, in 2004 he had the leading role in Emir Kusturica's Life Is a Miracle, some years after playing the role of a stutterer in the internationally acclaimed film Underground of same director Kusturica.

External links
 

1960 births
Living people
People from Perušić
Croats of Serbia
Serbian male film actors
Serbian male child actors
University of Belgrade Faculty of Dramatic Arts alumni